The 1955 NFL season was the 36th regular season of the National Football League. NBC paid $100,000 to replace DuMont as the national television network for the NFL Championship Game. The season ended when the Cleveland Browns defeated the Los Angeles Rams  in the title game.

Draft
The 1955 NFL Draft was held from January 27–28, 1955 at Philadelphia's Warwick Hotel. With the first pick, the Baltimore Colts selected running back George Shaw from the University of Oregon.

Major rule changes
The ball is dead immediately when the ball carrier touches the ground with any part of his body except his hands or feet while in the grasp of an opponent.
A new exception is made in regard to scoring a safety: When a defender intercepts a pass, his intercepting momentum carries him into his own end zone, and he is stopped before returning the ball back into the field of play, then the ball will be next put in play at the spot of the interception.

Conference races
The defending champion Browns dropped their opener, at home, to the Redskins 27–17, but a six-game win streak put them back in front to win the Eastern race.  The Western race was crowded a few times, as the Rams had to share the lead. In Week Eight, the Bears beat Los Angeles 24–3, to give both teams 5–3 records, The next week (November 20), the Bears took the lead with a 24–14 at Detroit while the Rams got a 17–17 tie at Baltimore.  As had happened many times before in the annual battle of Chicago, the Bears were upset by the Cardinals in Week Ten (November 27), 53–14; the Rams eked out a 23–21 in Philadelphia on Les Richter's field goal with 0:07 left in the game.  In Week Eleven (December 4), the Rams won 20–14 over Baltimore, and the Bears kept their hopes alive with a difficult 21–20 win over Detroit. In the latter game, the Lions' Doak Walker missed an extra point, lost a fumble late in the game on the Detroit 28, and was wide on a 35-yard field goal attempt in the final seconds. The Bears won their last game (December 11), 17–10 over Philadelphia, to finish 8–4, and hoped for the 7–3–1 Rams would lose their game in Los Angeles against Green Bay.  The Rams did not lose, clinching a spot in the title game, with a 31–17 win.

Final standings

NFL Championship Game
Cleveland 38, Los Angeles 14 at Los Angeles Memorial Coliseum, Los Angeles, Monday, December 26, 1955

League leaders

Awards
NEA NFL Most Valuable Player – Harlon Hill, Chicago Bears
UPI NFL Most Valuable Player – Otto Graham, Cleveland Browns
Sporting News NFL Player of the Year – Otto Graham, Cleveland Browns

Coaching changes
Chicago Cardinals: Joe Stydahar was replaced by Ray Richards.
Los Angeles Rams: Hamp Pool was replaced by Sid Gillman.
San Francisco 49ers: Buck Shaw was replaced by Red Strader.

References

 NFL Record and Fact Book
 NFL History 1951–1960 (Last accessed December 4, 2005)
 Total Football: The Official Encyclopedia of the National Football League

National Football League seasons